Peter George Schweyer (born July 26, 1978) is a Democratic member of the Pennsylvania House of Representatives representing the 22nd House district in Lehigh County, Pennsylvania.

Committee assignments 

 Appropriations
 Committee On Committees
 Committee On Ethics
 Consumer Affairs
 Professional Licensure

References

External links
PA House profile
Official Party website

Living people
Democratic Party members of the Pennsylvania House of Representatives
21st-century American politicians
1978 births
Politicians from Allentown, Pennsylvania
Pennsylvania State University alumni